RS-56 was an American liquid-fueled rocket engine, developed by Rocketdyne. RS-56 was derived from the RS-27 rocket engine, which itself is derived from the Rocketdyne H-1 rocket engine used in the Saturn I and Saturn IB. Two variants of this engine were built, both for use on the Atlas II rocket series. The first, RS-56-OBA, was a booster engine, while the RS-56-OSA was designed for use as a sustainer and produced lower thrust but at a higher specific impulse.

References

Rocketdyne engines
Rocket engines using the gas-generator cycle
Rocket engines using kerosene propellant
Rocket engines of the United States